Porn Studies is a quarterly peer-reviewed academic journal covering the study of pornography. It is published by Routledge and was established in 2014. The editors-in-chief are Feona Attwood (Middlesex University), John Mercer (Birmingham City University), and Clarissa Smith (University of Sunderland).

In a call for papers, the editors described the journal as "the first dedicated, international, peer-reviewed journal to critically explore those cultural products and services designated as pornographic".

Reception and review 

Writing in The Guardian, John Dugdale considered the journal's appearance to be an implicit criticism of cultural studies' failure to investigate pornography, a reflection of the dispute in second-wave feminism between supporters and opponents of pornography. The newspaper associated the editors with the former position, as for example represented by Angela Carter.

The journal's establishment was criticized by anti-pornography campaigners. Gail Dines, a leading anti-pornography activist, compared Attwood and Smith to "climate change deniers" and "cheerleaders for the industry".

Lily Rothman of Time magazine commented that "anyone looking for titillation is likely to be disappointed. (Unless what turns you on is sociological analysis, in which case—it's your lucky day.)" According to Alexis Madrigal of The Atlantic, "the mere fact of its existence, which became public in mid-2013, was occasion for a media event. But the journal's articles are serious articulations of the intersection between the concerns of media studies and those of pornography. Porn Studies is not a joke, though it seems to provide everyone with some relief to treat it as one."

References

External links 
 

2014 establishments in England
English-language journals
Publications established in 2014
Quarterly journals
Sexology journals
Routledge academic journals
Taylor & Francis academic journals